Diwan Sawan Mal Chopra (died 29 September 1844) was the Punjabi Hindu Khatri Diwan (governor) of Lahore and Multan. He was born into a Chopra Khatri family originally from Gujranwala, the region where Maharaja Ranjit Singh's Misl, the Sukerchakias held sway He was a 'Munshi' to Malik Mohan Lal, Subahdar of Multan under the Durranis. Along with Hari Singh Nalwa, he was a top commander in Maharaja Ranjit Singh's army. As a general under Ranjit Singh, he assisted in wresting the 'subah' (province) of Multan from the Durrani Afghans in 1823, after which he was made Diwan of the region. He instituted improvements in agricultural production through irrigation schemes.

In 1834, he signed an agreement on behalf of the Maharaja with Sardar Karam Khan, a Mazari warrior respected highly in his tribe as well as in the Sikh Army. Sardar Karam Khan was the younger brother of Mir Bahram Khan, Chief of the Baloch Mazari tribe, thereby ending the long war between the Sikhs and the Mazaris of Rojhan. He was succeeded to the governorship of Multan by his son, Diwan Mulraj Chopra, who was the last ethnic Punjabi to administer Multan.

He died on 29 September 1844 due to wounds inflicted upon him by an under-trial prisoner.

References

Indian Hindus
Punjabi people
Punjabi Hindus
History of Punjab
People of the Sikh Empire
Year of birth unknown
Year of death unknown